Internal Salvation is the sixth full-length studio album of American streetpunk band The Unseen. It was released on July 16, 2007 and is the band's second album released via Hellcat Records (subsidiary label of Epitaph Records).

Track listing
 "Intro (The Brutal Truth)"   1:21
 "Such Tragedy" (lyrics: Mark music: Scott)              2:18
 "At Point Break" (lyrics: Mark music: Scott)      1:56
 "Right Before Your Eyes" (lyrics: Mark music: Scott)    2:09
 "Torn and Shattered (Nothing Left)" (lyrics: Mark music: Scott & Tripp)    2:45
 "Break Away" (lyrics: Mark music: Scott)    2:14
 "Let It Go" (lyrics: Tripp music: Scott & Tripp)    2:40
 "No Direction" (lyrics: Mark music: Scott)    2:55
 "In Your Place" (lyrics: Mark music: Scott)    2:49
 "Left For Dead" (lyrics: Mark music: Ian Galloway & Scott)    2:35
 "Step Inside...Take Your Life" (lyrics: Mark music: Scott)    1:28
 "Act the Part" (lyrics & music: Tripp)    2:38
 "Talking Bombs" (Bill Close, Cliff "Hanger" Croce)¤    2:38
 "Still Believe" × 
¤ = Cover of "The Freeze"
× = Bonus track on European CD version

Themes

Whereas the themes of their previous album State of Discontent were heavily political, the lyrical themes of Internal Salvation focus on more personal and philosophical themes, as the album's title suggests.  "Break Away" is about breaking free of the destructive forces that shape the way we live, while "Right Before Your Eyes" suggests that the material world we value is disintegrating right in front of us.

Personnel
 Mark Unseen – lead vocals
 Scott Unseen – lead guitar, vocals
 Tripp Underwood – bass, vocals
 Jonny – rhythm guitar, backing Vocals
 Pat Melzard – drums
 Bill Brown - backing vocals
 Ian Galloway - backing vocals
 Marc Cannata - backing vocals

References

External links
Internal Salvation @ discogs.com

The Unseen (band) albums
2007 albums
Hellcat Records albums